María Teresa Mallada de Castro (born 14 January 1973) is a Spanish People's Party (PP) politician. A mining engineer, she was the first woman and youngest person to be president of the public mining corporation Hunosa (2012–2018). She has led her party in the General Junta of the Principality of Asturias since 2019.

Biography
Mallada was born in Cabañaquinta, Asturias to a local father and a mother from the Province of Jaén in Andalusia. She studied Advanced Mining Engineering at the University of Oviedo and began working at a gold mine, before joining the public mining corporation Hunosa initially on an internship in 1999.

At the age of 20, Mallada joined the People's Party (PP), becoming the leader of the New Generations and the party proper in the municipality of Aller. In 2010, she became Vice Secretary of the People's Party of Asturias and was on the list for the 2011 Asturian regional election, without being elected.

In February 2012, Mallada became president of Hunosa. She was the youngest person and first woman to hold the position. She left the corporation's presidency in July 2018 and was one of 164 employees who went into early retirement a year later when she was 46; unions and the state had agreed that those soon to be aged 51 could have early retirement due to the danger of the job.

Mallada was personally chosen by PP president Pablo Casado to lead the party in the 2019 Asturian regional election, having polled better than the previous lead candidate Mercedes Fernández. The party came second, dropping one seat to ten. Mallada's selection ahead of Fernández led to a leadership crisis in the Asturian PP, ending when the latter accepted a place in the Senate; the party' regional presidency remained vacant until Mallada assumed it in October 2020.

References

1973 births
Living people
People from Aller, Asturias
University of Oviedo alumni
Mining engineers
Spanish women engineers
People's Party (Spain) politicians
Members of the General Junta of the Principality of Asturias